Patrick Francis Leane (11 January 1930 – 12 October 2018) was an Australian track and field athlete who competed in the 1952 Summer Olympics and in the 1956 Summer Olympics.

References

1930 births
2018 deaths
Athletes from Melbourne
Australian male long jumpers
Olympic athletes of Australia
Athletes (track and field) at the 1952 Summer Olympics
Athletes (track and field) at the 1956 Summer Olympics
Australian male high jumpers